Miñiques is a massive volcanic complex containing a large number of craters, lava domes and flows, located in the Antofagasta Region of Chile.

Mountain 

Miñiques consists of four overlapping volcanoes formed by lava domes and stratovolcanoes. A set of well developed moraines exists on the southern flank and may reflect glaciers advancing either from the summit area or a plateau at  elevation; overall however glaciation on Miñiques was of limited extent and the terrain of Miñiques today is dominated by periglacial processes. Laguna Miñiques lies on its northwestern foot; it was separated from Laguna Miscanti by a lava flow from Miñiques.

It is of Pleistocene age and formed by andesitic and dacitic rocks; it formed during two stages in the Pliocene and Plio-Pleistocene. There is no indication of historical eruptions and the volcano is classified as extinct and its lava flows have been offset by faulting, but activity of the Pliocene-Pleistocene volcano may have continued into the Holocene. Renewed eruptions may impact  as well as the surroundings of Laguna Miñiques and would mostly consist of lava flows, but are unlikely to impact populated areas.

There are a number of craters, some of which contain lava domes and lava flows. Stone structures and archeological sites are found on the summit and the flanks of Miñiques mountain, and the church of Socaire is oriented towards the mountain. The Inca associated the mountain with the god Tunupa and with lightning.

See also
 List of volcanoes in Chile
 Chiliques
 Cerro Miscanti
 Cordón Puntas Negras
 Caichinque
 Los Flamencos National Reserve
 Chile

References

Sources

Further sources

External links

 SI Google Earth Placemarks - Smithsonian Institution Global Volcanism Program: download placemarks with SI  Holocene volcano-data.

Volcanoes of Antofagasta Region
Mountains of Chile
Stratovolcanoes of Chile
Pliocene stratovolcanoes
Pleistocene stratovolcanoes